Street Player is the sixth studio album by funk band Rufus (and their fourth album featuring singer Chaka Khan), released on the ABC Records label in 1978. Street Player was the band's third album to top Billboards R&B Albums chart and also reached #14 on Pop. The album includes the singles "Stay" (US R&B #3, US Pop #38) and "Blue Love" (US R&B #34).

History
In 1978, Rufus and Chaka Khan were a top-selling band. Their last four releases had gone platinum and the group continued to sell out in arenas as a headlining act with fiery Khan leading the way. By this point, Khan's stardom outside the group had grown and it led to the group drifting apart. While Khan opted to stay a member of the group, other members were uncomfortable that Khan was now offered solo contracts.

After the release of this record, Khan would sign a solo deal with Warner Bros. Records releasing her debut album, featuring the hit, "I'm Every Woman". While Khan went on to a solo career, Rufus cut Numbers, in 1979, without her. Khan, however, didn't leave the group, returning for their Quincy Jones-produced Masterjam later that same year.

Also after the departure of original drummer Andre Fischer, Richard "Moon" Calhoun took over on this album on drums.  This would be his only album with the group.  Additionally, the jazz/rock band Chicago featured a version of the title track on their 1979 album Chicago 13, with Peter Cetera on lead vocals.  The song was co-written by Chicago's drummer at that time, Danny Seraphine.  The track "Stay" was later covered by Erykah Badu on her 1997 album Live as well as performing on the Fox crime drama New York Undercover episode "Vendetta", first aired on April 24, 1997.

Track listing

The listing of tracks on the back of the album as distributed in Canada (GRT of Canada Ltd.) is in the following order:
 Destiny
 Stranger To Love
 Street Player
 Stay
 Best Of Your Heart
 Finale
 Take Time
 Blue Love
 Turn
 Change Your Ways

The listing on the album labels (sides 1 & 2) is as on the main listing.

Personnel
Chaka Khan – lead vocals, background vocals
Tony Maiden – guitar, percussion, lead vocals, background vocals
Kevin Murphy – keyboards
Bobby Watson – bass, percussion
David "Hawk" Wolinski – keyboards, background vocals
Richard "Moon" Calhoun – drums, percussion, background vocals 
Jerry Hey – trumpet, flugelhorn
Larry Williams – saxophone, flute, piccolo
Kim Hutchcroft – saxophone, flute
Bill Reichenbach Jr. – trombone
Helen Lowe – additional background vocals
Everett Bryson, Jr. – percussion

Production
Rufus, Roy Halee – producers
Roy Halee, George Belle – engineers
Clare Fischer – string arrangements & conductor
Seawind, Rufus –  horn arrangements 
Brian Gardner – audio mastering

ChartsAlbumSingles'''

See also
List of Billboard number-one R&B albums of 1978

References

External linksStreet Player'' at Discogs

1978 albums
Chaka Khan albums
Rufus (band) albums
Albums produced by Roy Halee
ABC Records albums